Samuel Groth and Chris Guccione were the defending champions, but they did not participate this year.

Li Zhe and Jose Rubin Statham won the tournament, defeating Dean O'Brien and Ruan Roelofse in the final, 6–4, 6–2.

Seeds

Draw

External links
 Main Draw

Gimcheon Open ATP Challenger - Doubles
2015 Doubles